Russell Alfred Pomeroy (June 23, 1927 – April 6, 2019) was an American football linebacker and guard who played who played for Stanford from 1949 to 1950. 

Pomeroy was born in 1927 on a ranch in Fontenelle, Wyoming. He attended Whittier Union High School in Whittier, California. He  served in the U.S. Merchant Marines and also as a U.S. Army paratrooper.

In 1950, he received the Pop Warner Trophy as the outstanding senior football player on the West Coast. He was also selected by both the Associated Press (AP), the United Press (UP), and the conference coaches as a first-team linebacker on the 1950 All-Pacific Coast football team. 

Pomeroy received a degree in petroleum geology and spent his career working in oil and gas exploration in Wyoming, Colorado, and Utah. He worked for many years for Occidental Petroleum before forming his own company, Sunburst Exploration, developing oil fields in Utah and Colorado.

References

1927 births
2019 deaths
American football linebackers
Stanford Cardinal football players
People from Whittier, California
Players of American football from Wyoming